Webhelp is a multi-national business process outsourcing and consultancy company headquartered in Paris.

History
Founded in June 2000 by Frédéric Jousset and Olivier Duha, Webhelp originally offered a real-time IT support services, before expanding into call centre operations and business support.

In 2011, London-based private equity firm Charterhouse Capital Partners acquired a major stake in the company. 

In February 2013, the group purchased Falkirk call centre firm HEROtsc. In 2014, Webhelp UK became a shirt sponsor of Falkirk F.C..

In 2013, Webhelp was awarded a £1.5 million Regional Selective Assitance grant from Scottish Development International, helping to create 400 new jobs. In 2019, it planned to move 120 jobs handling calls for Thomas Cook from Falkirk to South Africa. 

In August 2015, Webhelp took over from Serco the running of two call centres in Aintree and Bolton serving the Shop Direct Group. Several months later, it proposed moving most of the operation to South Africa.

In June 2016, Webhelp acquired GoExcellent, a Scandinavian customer experience firm which operates nine centers across Sweden, Finland, Norway and Denmark, and employs 1,700 people. This acquisition allowed for the launch of Webhelp Nordic, and increased Webhelp's projected 2016 turnover to an estimated $1 billion (725 million Euros).

By November 2020, Webhelp employed more than 55,000 people in over 35 countries.

References

Service companies of France
Business process outsourcing companies
Companies based in Paris
Companies established in 2000